The 2019–20 North Carolina Central Eagles men's basketball team represented North Carolina Central University in the 2019–20 NCAA Division I men's basketball season. The Eagles, led by 11th-year head coach LeVelle Moton, played their home games at McDougald–McLendon Arena in Durham, North Carolina as members of the Mid-Eastern Athletic Conference. They finished the season 19-14, 13–3 in MEAC play, winning the MEAC regular season championship. They defeated Delaware State in the quarterfinals of the MEAC tournament. They were scheduled to play the winner of the quarterfinal matchup between Bethune–Cookman and Morgan State in the semifinals, but the remainder of the tournament was cancelled due to the ongoing COVID pandemic.

Previous season
The Eagles finished the 2018–19 season 18–16 overall, 10–6 in MEAC play, finishing in 3rd place. In the MEAC tournament, they defeated Delaware State in the quarterfinals, North Carolina A&T in the semifinals, advancing to the championship game against top-seeded Norfolk State, upsetting the Spartans, winning the MEAC's automatic bid to the NCAA tournament for the third consecutive year. Also, for the third consecutive year, they received the No. 16 seed, and played in the First Four, this time losing to North Dakota State.

Roster

Schedule and results

|-
!colspan=12 style=| Non-conference regular season

|-
!colspan=9 style=| MEAC regular season

|-
!colspan=12 style=| MEAC tournament
|-

|-

Source

References

North Carolina Central Eagles men's basketball seasons
North Carolina Central Eagles
North Carolina Central Eagles men's basketball
North Carolina Central Eagles men's basketball